Rhode Lee Michelson (March 9, 1943 – February 15, 1961) was an American figure skater. She placed third at the 1961 U.S. Championships, earning her the chance to compete a month later at the World Championships. A hip injury forced Rhode to withdraw from the North American Championships in early February 1961. She was killed along with the entire 1961 United States Figure Skating team on February 15, 1961, when Sabena Flight 548 crashed near Brussels, Belgium, en route to the World Championships in Prague, Czechoslovakia. She was just 17 years old when she died.

Results

 N. = novice, J. = junior

External links
 U.S. Figure Skating biography

American female single skaters
1943 births
1961 deaths
Victims of aviation accidents or incidents in Belgium
Victims of aviation accidents or incidents in 1961
20th-century American women